Penn State Great Valley School of Graduate Professional Studies  is a special mission campus and graduate school of the Pennsylvania State University located in East Whiteland Township, Pennsylvania, near Malvern. Academic programs include engineering, information science, MBA, data analytics, finance, and leadership. Continuing professional education courses and customized corporate training are also offered. Classes are geared toward working adults and meet evenings and Saturdays in seven- and fourteen-week sessions.

History

Penn State Great Valley, founded in 1963 to provide graduate engineering programs to employees of local businesses, was housed in a rented school building in King of Prussia, Pennsylvania and was known as the King of Prussia Graduate Center.  In 1974, the center began offering courses off-site at area businesses.  In 1978, the center moved to an old elementary school building in Radnor, Pennsylvania.  In 1982 the center moved back to King of Prussia and became the King of Prussia Center for Graduate Studies and Continuing Education.

In 1987, the university acquired  within the Great Valley Corporate Center in Malvern, Pennsylvania.  A new facility was built on the site earning the distinction of being the first permanent campus in the country located within a corporate park.  The campus moved to the new location in 1988, introduced a graduate management program, and changed its name to Penn State Great Valley.  In 1998, the Board of Trustees approved the Great Valley campus as a distinct School of Graduate Professional Studies.  Due to its expanding programs, the Safeguard Scientifics Building was built next to the original facility and opened in 2001 with a 400-seat auditorium and additional classrooms.

In 2010, the Safeguard Scientifics Building was renamed as “The Conference Center at Penn State Great Valley.” The decision to rename The Conference Center at Penn State Great Valley took place in close consultation with Safeguard Scientifics to reflect more accurately the primary use of the building as a corporate and community meeting space.

Academics
The Penn State Great Valley School of Graduate Professional Studies houses two academic divisions:
 Engineering and Information Science: Master of Science in Information Science, Master of Engineering in Systems Engineering, Master of Software Engineering, Master of Engineering Management, Master of Professional Studies in Data Analytics, Master of Science in Data Analytics, and graduate certificates in cyber security, data analytics, and systems engineering. Classes are held on the Great Valley Campus, at the Philadelphia Navy Yard, and online.
 Management:  AACSB-accredited Master of Business Administration, Master of Finance, Master of Leadership Development, and graduate certificates in finance, sustainable management practices, health sector management, and human resource management.

In addition to its degree programs, continuing professional education courses and certificate programs are offered in areas of business and technology.  Programs exist in project management, leadership development, Lean Six Sigma, agile programs, GMAT exam preparation, CISSP exam preparation, PMP exam preparation, and various workshops.  Continuing professional education courses can be customized and delivered to companies and organizations at the Penn State Great Valley campus or at their location.

References

External links

Pennsylvania State University colleges
Educational institutions established in 1963
Universities and colleges in Chester County, Pennsylvania
1963 establishments in Pennsylvania
Great Valley